The 2019–20 season was Aston Villa's 25th season in the Premier League, and their 106th season in the top flight of English football, following their promotion from the EFL Championship by winning the play-offs. It is the club's 145th year in existence.

On 29 November 2019, midway through his first Premier League season with the club, manager Dean Smith signed a contract extension lasting until 2023. 

In the EFL Cup, Villa advanced past Crewe Alexandra of League Two and four Premier League sides in Brighton & Hove Albion, Wolverhampton Wanderers, Liverpool and Leicester City to reach the final at Wembley Stadium; they lost the final 2–1 to Manchester City. 

In the league though, Villa were four points deep inside the relegation zone with four games left to play of the 2019–20 season, but pulled off what Smith described as a "magnificent achievement" to clinch survival on the last day with a 1–1 draw at West Ham United.

Pre-season

Friendlies
On 7 June 2019, Aston Villa announced its pre-season schedule.

Competitions

Premier League
 

Villa were four points deep inside the relegation zone with four games left to play of the 2019–20 season, but pulled off what Smith described as a "magnificent achievement" to clinch survival on the last day with a 1–1 draw at West Ham United.

League table

Results summary

Results by matchday

Matches
On 13 June 2019, the Premier League fixtures were announced. On 5 April 2020, the season was suspended indefinitely due to the COVID-19 pandemic in the United Kingdom. On 28 May 2020, a date for the resumption of the Premier League was given as the 19 June 2020. A full fixture list was confirmed on 4 June 2020 - which had the season returning at 6 PM on 17 June.

EFL Cup 

On 13 August 2019, the Second Round of the EFL Cup was drawn by Gary Neville and Paul Robinson at Salford City's Moor Lane stadium. The Third Round draw was held on 28 August 2019 at Lincoln City's Sincil Bank stadium. The Fourth Round draw was held on 25 September 2019 at MK Dons' Stadium MK. The Quarter-Final draw was held on 31 October 2019, by David James and Zoe Ball on BBC Radio 2. The Semi-Final draw was held on 18 December 2019, at Oxford United's Kassam Stadium by Dennis Wise and Chris Kamara.

FA Cup 

On 2 December 2019, the draw was made for the Third Round of the FA Cup at the Etihad Stadium by Tony Adams and former Villa player, Micah Richards.

Transfers

Transfers in

Transfers out

Loans in

Loans out

Squad statistics

Appearances and goals

|-
! colspan=14 style=background:#dcdcdc; text-align:center| Goalkeepers

|-
! colspan=14 style=background:#dcdcdc; text-align:center| Defenders

|-

|-
! colspan=14 style=background:#dcdcdc; text-align:center| Midfielders

 
     

|-
! colspan=14 style=background:#dcdcdc; text-align:center| Forwards

|-
! colspan=14 style=background:#dcdcdc; text-align:center| Players transferred or loaned out during the season

|-

Based on matches played until 26 July 2020

Based on matches played until 26 July 2020

References

 

Aston Villa
Aston Villa F.C. seasons